Rondinelli may refer to:

Antônio Rondinelli (born 1954), former Brazilian footballer who played as a central defender 
Arnold "Spider" Rondinelli (1935-2017), American jazz drummer
Bobby Rondinelli (born 1955), American rock drummer
Dennis A. Rondinelli (1943–2007), American professor and researcher of public administration
Niccolo Rondinelli (c. 1468 – c. 1520), Italian painter of the Renaissance period
Rondinelli (band), American heavy metal band formed by Bobby Rondinelli

See also
Rondinelly (born 1991), Brazilian footballer who plays as an attacking midfielder